Niranjan Patnaik  (born 22 February 1948) is an Indian politician, from Odisha. He is a former state president of Odisha Pradesh  Congress Committee and former minister of Odisha State.

References

Living people
Indian National Congress politicians
People from Odisha
People from Kendujhar district
People from Delhi
1948 births
Indian National Congress politicians from Odisha